The Aromanians in Albania are an officially recognised ethnic minority in Albania.

Ethnonyms

The Aromanians in Albania are officially called the Minoriteti Arumun. The local population often refers to them as Vllehë, Çobenjë (from Turkish çoban, "shepherd"),  Xacët or Xinxarët, Gogët, and Llacifacët.

History
The Aromanians were first recognized at the London Conference of 1912–13 as a minority group within Albania. They fought the Ottoman Empire alongside the Serbians and Greeks during the Balkan Wars.

During the communist regime in Albania, the Aromanians were not recognised as a separate minority group. Following the fall of communism in Albania, there was a revival of ethnic Aromanian identity in the country. Assimilation and identification have been and continue to be a complex issue relating to the Aromanians of Albania and the wider Balkans.

Historical settlements
Moscopole

The city of Moscopole (Albanian: Voskopojë) was once home to the largest Aromanian population in the world. It was the cultural and commercial centre of the Aromanians with a population of over 3,500 people. The city was razed to the ground by Ali Pasha of Ioannina in 1788, causing an exodus of Aromanian people across the Balkans. Many of them ended up in what would become North Macedonia, Albania and Greece. The largest concentration of Aromanians was in the Pelister region of North Macedonia, the city of Kruševo and around the Lake Prespa. The Moscopolitans (Moscopoleanji in Aromanian), is one of the largest population of Aromanians today. They speak the Moscopolean dialect of Aromanian and are the descendants of the Moscopoleans in Krusevo (Aromanian: Crushuva, Macedonian: Крушево) are today a fully recognized minority group under the constitutional law of North Macedonia. 

Grabova

Grabova was a medieval town created in the 10th century. Aromanians have left Grabova on several occasions, although the village has never been completely deserted. The first wave of depopulation took place in the 17th century, when Grabova shared the fate of Moscopole and during the inter-war period, starting with 1931, many of Grabovars emigrated to Elbasan and Lushnjë. In 1933, 15 families from the village emigrated to Romania; they initially settled in Southern Dobruja and then, in 1940, in the village of Nisipari, Constanța County, from where they moved to the larger nearby towns (Medgidia, Ovidiu, Constanța ) Another important immigration began in 1950, when communist authorities used the craftsmen from Grabova to build the industrial units in Korçë, Pogradec, Gramsh, Elbasan, and Tirana. The people of Grabova speak the Grabovar dialect of Aromanian.

Culture

Music

Religion

Aromanians in Albania are predominantly Orthodox Christians like the rest of Aromanians. In Korçë they have an Aromanian-language church named Ayiu Sutir (Transfiguration of Jesus), and is the only church in Albania that is preaching in Aromanian language. Before that, they had another church also in Korçë with the same name, built in 1925 and destroyed by an earthquake in 1931.

Media
Aromanian-language media include the newspapers Popullorë and Ta Néa tis Omónias, both being pro-Greek. There are also the newspapers Frația Vëllazëria and Fratsilia which appear only irregularly.

Education
As of 2001 there was no official education in Aromanian.

Demographics
The exact presence of the Aromanian community in Albania is unknown. 8,266 people declared themselves to be Aromanians in the 2011 census. On the quality of the specific data the Advisory Committee on the Framework Convention for the Protection of National Minorities stated that "the results of the census should be viewed with the utmost caution and calls on the authorities not to rely exclusively on the data on nationality collected during the census in determining its policy on the protection of national minorities.". According to Tom Winnifrith in 1995, that there were about 200,000 individuals who were of Aromanian descent in Albania, regardless of proficiency in Aromanian, or spoke Aromanian without necessarily considering themselves to have a separate identity. According to Frank Kressing and Karl Kaser in 2002, there were between 30,000 and 50,000 Aromanians in Albania. In 2004 Arno Tanner pointed out Albania as the only country where Vlachs make a relatively significant percentage of population, around 2%.

In the context of the census conducted in 2011 in Albania, representatives of the Aromanian community in the country stated that the results do not reflect the real number of the Aromanian population of Albania.

List of settlements
In Albania, Aromanian communities inhabit Moscopole, their most famous settlement, the Kolonjë District (where they are concentrated), a quarter of Fier (Aromanian Ferãcã), while Aromanian was taught, as recorded by Tom Winnifrith, at primary schools in Andon Poçi near Gjirokastër (Aromanian Ljurocastru), Shkallë (Aromanian Scarã) near Sarandë, and Borovë near Korçë (Aromanian Curceau) (1987). A Romanian research team concluded in the 1960s that Albanian Aromanians migrated to Tirana, Stan Karbunarë, Skrapar, Pojan, Bilisht and Korçë, and that they inhabited Karaja, Lushnjë, Moscopole, Drenovë and Boboshticë (Aromanian Bubushtitsa).

Central Albania

The Myzeqe is an area in southwestern-central Albania which encompasses parts of the Fier, Tirana and Durrës counties. It has a large Aromanian population spread across many villages. The Aromanian inhabitants of Myzeqe are referred to as Muzachiars or Muzachirenji in Aromanian.
 Divjakë
 Elbasan
 Grabovë e Sipërme  
 Fier

Southern Albania

Berat County
 Berat 
 Ura Vajgurore
 Vanë

Vlorë County
 Selenicë  
 Xarrë  
 Kardhikaq

Gjirokastër Country
 Gjirokastër 
 Humelicë  
 Labovë
 Qestorat 
 Stegopul 
 Saraqinisht
 Selckë
 Zagoria 
 Shkallë   
 Frashër
 Përmet
 Çarshovë
 Leusë

Korcë County
A large portion of Aromanians can be found in Southeastern Albania.

 Moscopole (or )  once a prosperous Aromanian center and today's village of Voskopojë. 
 Korçë   
 Vithkuq  
 Drenovë   
 Boboshticë  
 Dardhë
 Leskovik

Minority status
The Aromanians were first recognized at the London Conference of 1912–1913 as a minority group until the communist era (1967). From 1967 until 1992, they were known as simple Albanians, and from 1992 until 2017, they were known as a cultural and linguistic minority. Since 2017, the Aromanians are an officially recognized ethnic minority in Albania.

The existing political divisions among the Aromanian population in Albania are the pro-Greek and Aromanian-only factions, which are the most numerous groups, as well as the pro-Romanian faction, the latter being less numerous. All of them promote their Aromanian ethnic background but differ on how they define their national identity. Namely, the pro-Greek group would concur with the majority of Aromanians in Greece that they are nationally Greek with Aromanian linguistic and cultural traits. On the other hand those supporting a completely distinct Aromanian identity claim that they are both nationally and ethnically Aromanians and would deny having Greek or Romanian national consciousness.

The Aromanians have their own political party in Albania. It is known as the Alliance for Equality and European Justice (ABDE), it was founded in 2011 and aims for the unification of all the Albanian Aromanians. There are only two other Aromanian political parties in the world, the Democratic Union of the Vlachs of Macedonia (DSVM) and the Party of the Vlachs of Macedonia (PVM), both in North Macedonia.

Education

In the University of Tirana, the Aromanian language is covered by the Faculty of Foreign Languages.

Media
Aromanian-language media in Albania are RTSH 2 and RTSH Gjirokastra. RTSH 2 broadcasts from Monday to Friday news and programms in Aromanian Language, while RTSH Gjirokastra only once a week. Beside TV media are also the internet radio RTV Armakedon, newspaper Fratia, magazine Fãrshãrotu and Arumunët/Vllehtë

Notable people from Albania
Education: 
 Daniel Moscopolites (1754–1825) - Aromanian scholar from modern-day Albania
 Aurel Plasari - Albanian intellectual
 Ilo Mitkë Qafëzezi - Albanian intellectual
 Mitrush Kuteli - Albanian writer, literary critic and translator
Finance:
Mocioni Family - Austro-Hungarian banking and philanthropist family.
Arts/Music:
Albert Vërria (1936-2015) - Albanian actor
Sandër Prosi (1924-1985) - Albanian actor
Nikolla Zoraqi (1928–1991) - composer
 Margarita Xhepa (1932-) - actress
 Ndricim Xhepa (Aromanian mother) (1957-) - actor
 Eli Fara (1968-) - Singer and songwriter
Janaq Paço (1914-1991) - Albanian sculptor
Jakov Xoxa (1923-1979) - Albanian author and writer
Parashqevi Simaku (1966-) - Albanian former musician.

Politics:
Dhimitër Tutulani (19 March 1857 – 1937), Albanian lawyer and politician 
Rita Marko (1920-2018) - Chairman of the Albanian Politburo.
Liri Gero (1926-1944) - Albanian World War II martyr and heroine. 
Teodor Heba (1914-2001) - Albanian chairman of the Politburo from 1950 to 1951. 
Nako Spiru (1918-1947) - Albanian communist politician 
Llazar Fundo (1899-1944) - Albanian communist, former member of the Balkan communist federation, purged in 1944. 
Athanas Shundi (1892-1940) - Albanian politician, pharmacist, and early supporter of the Albanian Orthodox Church 
 
Religion:
 Damian of Albania (1886-1973) - Archbishop of the Albanian Orthodox Church from 1966 to 1967
Nektarios Terpos (end 17th–18th century) priest and author
 Theodore Kavalliotis (1718–1789) - Greek priest and teacher
 Ioakeim Martianos (1875-1955) - Greek priest & teacher.
Other:

Margarita Tutulani (1925 – 6 July 1943) anti-fascist

Gallery

See also
 Aromanians in Bulgaria
 Aromanians in Greece
 Aromanians in North Macedonia
 Aromanians in Romania
 Aromanians in Serbia
 Moscopole

References

Works cited

External links
 

 
Ethnic groups in Albania